Art Klein is a producer known for Bottle Shock, Nobel Son and Marilyn Hotchkiss' Ballroom Dancing & Charm School, among others. He is a graduate of New York Institute of Technology.

References

External links

Year of birth missing (living people)
Living people
New York Institute of Technology alumni
American film producers
Place of birth missing (living people)